Turks in Saudi Arabia also referred to as Turkish Arabians, Turkish Saudi Arabians, Saudi Arabian Turks, Arabian Turks or Saudi Turks refers to ethnic Turkish people living in Saudi Arabia. The majority of Arabian Turks descend from Ottoman settlers who arrived in the region during the Ottoman rule of Arabia. Most Ottoman Turkish descendants in Saudi Arabia trace their roots to Anatolia; however, some ethnic Turks also came from the Balkans, Cyprus, the Levant, North Africa and other regions which had significant Turkish communities. In addition to Ottoman settlement policies, Turkish pilgrims to Mecca and Medina often settled down in the area permanently. 

There has also been modern migration to Saudi Arabia from the Republic of Turkey as well as other modern nation-states which were once part of the Ottoman Empire.

History

Ottoman Turkish migration
Turks have had a presence in the western Arabian peninsula for hundreds of years, culminating in the Ottoman conquest of the Hejaz in 1517. After the Great Arab Revolt and the decline of the Ottoman Empire, a Turkish minority remained in the newly founded Saudi Kingdom.

Modern Turkish migration
Starting in the 1970s, economic relations between Turkey and Saudi Arabia grew. In 1977, there was 6,500 Turks in Saudi Arabia, 5,000 of which were officially reported workers.

Business 
There are some 2,100 Turkish-operated hairdresser shops, 3,200 restaurants, and 1,900 furniture stores in Saudi Arabia.

Politics 
During the 2017 Turkish constitutional referendum, more than 8 thousand Turkish expats from Saudi Arabia cast votes whether Turkey should abolish it's parliamentary system and become a presidential republic. 58.34% of the Turkish expatriates in Saudi Arabia opted for "No", while 41.66% voted for "Yes". The yes vote was concentrated in Jeddah and the Western Region, while in Riyadh no was the dominant choice. The no vote was significantly higher compared to votes of several European Turkish expat communities.

Religion 
Turkish people living in Saudi Arabia are Sunni Muslims. Turkish laborers returning from Riyadh seem to be less likely to espouse Shariah (Islamic law) than those living in European countries.

Notable people 
Kamal Adham, businessman (Turkish mother)
Iffat Al-Thunayan, princess and the most prominent wife of King Faisal
children:
Princess Sara, activist for women and children welfare
Prince Mohammed, businessman
Princess Latifa 
Prince Saud, served as Saudi Arabia's foreign minister from 1975 to 2015
Prince Abdul Rahman, military officer and businessman
Prince Bandar, military officer
Prince Turki, chairman of King Faisal Foundation's Center for Research and Islamic Studies
Princess Lolowah, prominent activist for women's education
Princess Haifa
grandchildren:
Amr bin Mohammed Al Saud, businessman
Reem Al Faisal, photographer
Faisal bin Turki Al Faisal Al Saud
Abdulaziz bin Turki Al Faisal, racing driver and businessman
Reema bint Bandar Al Saud, Saudi Arabian ambassador to the United States
Khalid bin Bandar bin Sultan Al Saud, Saudi Arabian Ambassador to the United Kingdom
Faisal bin Bandar bin Sultan Al Saud, president of the Saudi Arabian Federation for Electronic and Intellectual Sports (SAFEIS) and the Arab eSports Federation 
Omar Basaad, music producer
Muhammad Khashoggi, medical doctor
children:
Adnan Khashoggi, businessman 
Samira Khashoggi, author and the owner and editor-in chief of Alsharkiah magazine
Soheir Khashoggi, novelist
grandchildren
Dodi Fayed, film producer 
Emad Khashoggi, businessman and the head of COGEMAD 
Jamal Khashoggi, general manager and editor-in-chief of Al-Arab News Channel 
Nabila Khashoggi, businesswoman, actress, and philanthropist

See also 
Saudi Arabia – Turkey relations
Turkish minorities in the former Ottoman Empire
Turks in the Arab world

References

Bibliography 
 
.
.
.
.
.
.
.
.
.
.

Saudi Arabia
Saudi Arabia
 
Ethnic groups in Saudi Arabia